Tractor Monkeys is an Australian comedic television quiz show hosted by Merrick Watts. Seventeen episodes screened on ABC1 in 2013.

Format
The show features two teams of guest panellists, one led by comedian Dave O'Neil and the other by radio presenter Katie "Monty" Dimond. They compete in rounds of questions and games about trends, fads and social phenomena. The show also included a second screen experience via an ABC Companion Pad app for iPad.

Episodes

Series 1

Series 2

Special

Ratings

Series 1

Series 2
All episodes aired at 8:00pm.

References

External links
 Tractor Monkeys official website

2010s Australian game shows
2013 Australian television series debuts
2013 Australian television series endings
Australian Broadcasting Corporation original programming
Australian comedy television series
Australian panel games
English-language television shows